Cola is a genus of trees native to the tropical forests of Africa, classified in the family Malvaceae, subfamily Sterculioideae (previously in the separate family Sterculiaceae). Species in this genus are sometimes referred to as kola tree or kola nut for the caffeine-containing fruit produced by the trees that is often used as a flavoring ingredient in beverages. The genus was thought to be closely related to the South American genus Theobroma, or cocoa, but the latter is now placed in a different subfamily. They are evergreen trees, growing up to 20 m tall (about 60 feet), with glossy ovoid leaves up to 30 cm long and star-shaped fruit.

Origin and distribution
Cola is a genus of the Family Malvaceae with approximately 100 to 125 species occurring in the evergreen lowland and montane forest of continental (primarily tropical) Africa. The earliest known evidence of Cola is Cola amharaensis, a well-preserved fossil leaf compression from the late Oligocene Guang River flora of Ethiopia and dated to 27.23 ± 0.1 Ma. Kola nuts are seeds harvested from pods, primarily from the species Cola nitida and Cola acuminata.  Outside mainland Africa, some species are cultivated for their nuts in Brazil, Jamaica and elsewhere in the humid tropics.

Species 

 Cola acuminata (P.Beauv.) Schott & Endl.
 Cola alba A.Chev.
 Cola altissima Engl.
 Cola angustifolia K.Schum.
 Cola anomala K.Schum.
 Cola argentea Mast.
 Cola attiensis Aubrév. & Pellegr.
 Cola ballayi Cornu ex Heckel
 Cola bilenguensis Pellegr.
 Cola bipindensis Engl.
 Cola bodardii Pellegr.
 Cola boxiana Brenan & Keay
 Cola brevipes K.Schum.
 Cola bruneelii De Wild.
 Cola buesgenii Engl.
 Cola buntingii Baker f.
 Cola cabindensis Exell
 Cola caricifolia (G.Don) K.Schum.
 Cola cauliflora Mast.
 Cola cecidiifolia Cheek
 Cola chlamydantha K.Schum.
 Cola chlorantha F.White
 Cola clavata Mast.
 Cola coccinea Engl. & K.Krause
 Cola congolana De Wild. & T.Durand
 Cola cordifolia (Cav.) R.Br.
 Cola crispiflora K.Schum.
 Cola digitata Mast.
 Cola discoglypremnophylla Brenan & A.P.D.Jones
 Cola diversifolia De Wild. & T.Durand
 Cola duparquetiana Baill.
 Cola edeensis Engl. & K.Krause
 Cola elegans Pierre ex Breteler
 Cola fibrillosa Engl. & K.Krause
 Cola ficifolia Mast.
 Cola flaviflora Engl. & K.Krause
 Cola flavovelutina K.Schum.
 Cola gabonensis Mast.
 Cola gigantea A.Chev.
 Cola gigas Baker f.
 Cola gilgiana Engl.
 Cola gilletii De Wild.
 Cola glabra Brenan & Keay
 Cola glaucoviridis Pellegr.
 Cola greenwayi Brenan
 Cola griseiflora De Wild.
 Cola heterophylla (P.Beauv.) Schott & Endl.
 Cola hispida Brenan & Keay
 Cola hypochrysea K.Schum.
 Cola idoumensis Pellegr.
 Cola kimbozensis Cheek
 Cola lasiantha Engl. & K.Krause
 Cola lateritia K.Schum.
 Cola laurifolia Mast.
 Cola le-testui Pellegr.
 Cola lepidota K.Schum.
 Cola letouzeyana Nkongmeneck
 Cola liberica Jongkind
 Cola lissachensis Pellegr.
 Cola lizae N.Hallé
 Cola lomensis Engl. & K.Krause
 Cola lorougnonis Aké Assi
 Cola louisii Germ.
 Cola lukei Cheek
 Cola macrantha K.Schum.
 Cola mahoundensis Pellegr.
 Cola marsupium K.Schum.
 Cola mayimbensis Pellegr.
 Cola mayumbensis Exell
 Cola megalophylla Brenan & Keay
 Cola metallica Cheek
 Cola millenii K.Schum.
 Cola minor Brenan
 Cola mixta A.Chev.
 Cola mossambicensis Wild
 Cola mosserayana Germ.
 Cola nana Engl. & K.Krause
 Cola natalensis Oliv.
 Cola ndongensis Engl. & K.Krause
 Cola nigerica Brenan & Keay
 Cola nitida (Vent.) Schott & Endl.
 Cola noldeae Exell & Mendonça
 Cola obtusa Engl. & K.Krause
 Cola octoloboides Brenan

 Cola pachycarpa K.Schum.
 Cola pallida A.Chev.
 Cola philipi-jonesii Brenan & Keay
 Cola pierlotii Germ.
 Cola porphyrantha Brenan
 Cola praeacuta Brenan & Keay
 Cola pseudoclavata Cheek
 Cola pulcherrima Engl.
 Cola quentinii Cheek
 Cola quintasii Engl.
 Cola reticulata A.Chev.
 Cola ricinifolia Engl. & K.Krause
 Cola rondoensis Cheek
 Cola rostrata K.Schum.
 Cola ruawaensis Cheek
 Cola rubra A.Chev.
 Cola scheffleri K.Schum.
 Cola sciaphila Louis ex Germ.
 Cola selengana Germ.
 Cola semecarpophylla K.Schum.
 Cola simiarum Sprague ex Brenan & Keay
 Cola sphaerocarpa A.Chev.
 Cola sphaerosperma Heckel
 Cola stelechantha Brenan
 Cola subglaucescens Engl.
 Cola suboppositifolia Cheek
 Cola sulcata Engl.
 Cola tessmannii Engl. & K.Krause
 Cola triloba (R.Br.) K.Schum.
 Cola tsandensis Pellegr.
 Cola uloloma Brenan
 Cola umbratilis Brenan & Keay
 Cola urceolata K.Schum.
 Cola usambarensis Engl.
 Cola vandersmisseniana Germ.
 Cola verticillata (Thonn.) Stapf ex A.Chev.
 Cola welwitschii Exell & Mendonça ex R.Germ.
 Cola winkleri Engl.

References 

 
Malvaceae genera